Ernst Carl Theodor Zincke (19 May 1843 – 17 March 1928) was a German chemist and the academic adviser of Otto Hahn.

Life
Theodor Zincke was born in Uelzen on 19 May 1843. He became a pharmacist and graduated in Göttingen with his Staatsexamen. He began studying chemistry with Friedrich Wöhler and received his Ph.D in 1869. He joined the group of August Kekulé at the University of Bonn, and in 1875 became professor at the University of Marburg where he remained until his retirement in 1913. He developed Zincke reaction, Zincke–Suhl reaction in 1906 (together with R. Suhl) and in 1900 Zincke nitration. Theodor Zincke died on 17 March 1928 in Marburg.

References
 

1843 births
1928 deaths
20th-century German chemists
Academic staff of the University of Bonn
Academic staff of the University of Marburg
19th-century German chemists
People from Uelzen